Dongnanosuchus is an extinct monotypic genus of alligatoroid crocodilian known from the Youganwo Formation of China during the Eocene. It contains a single species, Dongnanosuchus hsui.

References 

Crocodilians
Prehistoric pseudosuchian genera
Paleocene reptiles of Asia
Paleocene crocodylomorphs
Fossil taxa described in 2021